Abdul Samad (born 25 February 1998) is a Pakistani cricketer. He made his List A debut for Pakistan International Airlines in the 2016–17 Departmental One Day Cup on 17 December 2016. He made his first-class debut for Faisalabad in the 2017–18 Quaid-e-Azam Trophy on 26 September 2017.

In April 2018, he was named in Punjab's squad for the 2018 Pakistan Cup.

References

External links
 

1998 births
Living people
Pakistani cricketers
Faisalabad cricketers
Pakistan International Airlines cricketers
Cricketers from Faisalabad